Mạc Cửu (or ; 1655–1736), also spelled Mok Kui, was a Chinese exile who founded the Principality of Hà Tiên and ruled as its first monarch. He played a role in the relations between Cambodia and the Vietnamese Nguyễn court.

He was born in Leizhou, Guangdong, then under the rule of the Southern Ming dynasty. His birth name was Mạc Kính Cửu (莫敬玖), which could be easily confused with several rulers of the Mạc dynasty, including Mạc Kính Chỉ, Mạc Kính Cung, Mạc Kính Khoan and Mạc Kính Vũ. Therefore, he changed his name to Mạc Cửu. Mạc Cửu later decided to immigrate to Vietnam to expand his business. Sometime between 1687 and 1695, the Cambodian king granted him the Khmer title Okna, and sponsored him to migrate to Banteay Meas, where he at first served as chief of a small Chinese community. 
He built a casino there and suddenly became rich. He then attracted his other fellow Chinese to resettle here, and built seven villages in Phú Quốc, Lũng Kỳ (Kep), Cần Bột (Kampot), Hương Úc (modern Sihanoukville), Giá Khê (Rạch Giá) and Cà Mau. Chinese had established their own town at Hà Tiên. Hà Tiên was originally known under the Khmer  name of Piem or Peam (also Pie, Pam, Bam), the Khmer for "port", "harbour" or "river mouth". It was known variously as Kang Kou in Chinese, and Pontomeas by Europeans. Hà Tiên was a part of Cambodia until the year 1714. However, this area had a dual political structure; Mạc Cửu ruled Chinese and Vietnamese; while local Khmers continued to be ruled by a Khmer governor, called Okna Reachea Setthi, until Siamese expedition of 1771 overthrew the local system of government.

Cambodia was invaded by Siamese army, Mạc Cửu was captured and taken to Bangkok. He had no chance to come back to Hà Tiên until a civil strife broke out in Siam.

Mạc Cửu later switched allegiance to the Nguyễn lords of Vietnam. He sent a tribute mission to the Nguyễn court in 1708, and in return received the title of Tong Binh of Hà Tiên and the noble title Marquess Cửu Ngọc. In 1715, the Cambodian king, Thommo Reachea III (Vietnamese: Nặc Ông Thâm), invaded Hà Tiên with the support of Siam in order to resumed the lost territory. Mạc Cửu was defeated and fled to Lũng Kỳ (mordern Kep). Cambodian sacked Hà Tiên and withdrew. Mạc Cửu came back to Hà Tiên, built several castles to defend his marquisate against attack. He died in 1735.

Mạc's son, Mạc Thiên Tứ, was born in 1700 to a lady from Biên Hòa. He also had a daughter, Mac Kim Dinh, who was married to the son of the exiled Chinese general Trần Thượng Xuyên. Mạc Cửu's descendants succeeded as the governor of Hà Tiên until the title was abolished by Vietnamese Nguyễn dynasty in 1832.

A genealogy of his clan is Hà Tiên trấn Hiệp trấn Mạc thị gia phả.

Notes

Sources

 Nicholas Sellers, The Princes of Hà-Tiên (1682-1867): the Last of the Philosopher-Princes and the Prelude to the French Conquest of Indochina: a Study of the Independent Rule of the Mac Dynasty in the Principality of Hà-Tiên, and the Establishment of the Empire of Vietnam, Brussels, Thanh-long, 1983.

1655 births
1735 deaths
Hoa people
Rulers of Hà Tiên
Generals of the Nguyễn lords
Qing dynasty emigrants
Minh Hương
Chinese emigrants to Cambodia
Chinese emigrants to Vietnam
Politicians from Zhanjiang
Ming dynasty people
Generals from Guangdong
Founding monarchs